Rock & Ice is a magazine published by Outside  focusing on rock and ice climbing. The first issue came out in March 1984. The first publisher was Neal Kaptain. George Bracksieck worked for him, beginning in January 1984, and the two became equal partners in September of that year. 

The magazine was bought out within the first year by George Bracksieck, who remained publisher and editor until the end of December 1997. His company, Eldorado Publishing, sold Rock & Ice to North-South Publications, an investment group led by Dougald MacDonald. After a few years, it was sold to Big Stone. The magazine is published eight times a year. It was headquartered in Boulder, Colorado until 2002, when it moved to Carbondale, Colorado. Rock & Ice was purchased by Outside in 2021. 

The cover of the first issue featured Alex Lowe climbing the first ascent of The Fang in Vail, Colorado.

See also 
 Alpinist magazine
 Summit magazine
 Climbing magazine

References

External links 
Official site

Sports magazines published in the United States
Climbing magazines
Magazines established in 1984
Magazines published in Colorado
Mass media in Boulder, Colorado
Eight times annually magazines published in the United States